Gwynne Evans (September 3, 1880 – January 12, 1965), an American competition swimmer and  water-polo player, represented the  United States at the 1904 Summer Olympics.

At the 1904 Olympics in St. Louis, Missouri, he won two bronze medals as a member of the third-placed American team in the 4x50-yard freestyle relay, and as a member of the third-placed Missouri Athletic Club team in the Olympic  water-polo tournament.

See also
 List of athletes with Olympic medals in different disciplines
 List of Olympic medalists in swimming (men)

References

External links

1880 births
1965 deaths
American male freestyle swimmers
American male water polo players
Olympic bronze medalists for the United States in swimming
Olympic medalists in water polo
Olympic water polo players of the United States
Swimmers at the 1904 Summer Olympics
Water polo players at the 1904 Summer Olympics
Medalists at the 1904 Summer Olympics
20th-century American people